The Cape of Gjuhëz is a rocky cape northwest of Karaburun Peninsula as well as the westernmost point of continental Albania. It projects  into the sea in the form of the tongue, thus the origin of its name. The cape lacks vegetation, while limestone rocks, highly eroded by Karst are spread over whole the area.

See also
List of lighthouses in Albania

References

External links
 Picture of the lighthouse

Karaburun-Sazan Marine Park
Headlands of Albania
Geography of Vlorë County